Jamar Dixon (born June 5, 1989) is a retired Canadian professional soccer player. He currently serves as Manager of Football and Player Development for Canadian Premier League club Pacific FC.

Club career

Sweden
Dixon began his professional career in Sweden, joining BW 90 IF in Sweden's fourth tier. He scored a goal in his first match with the club.

Finland
Dixon left Sweden and joined Finnish side TP-47 in early 2014. He would later make the jump to fellow Finnish team JIPPO on September 1, 2014.

Dixon signed with top flight outfit FF Jaro after a successful trial on January 26, 2015. He made his debut on February 7 in the Finnish Cup. Dixon made his league debut for Jaro against IFK Mariehamn on April 12 in a 1–1 draw. Dixon scored his first Veikkausliiga goal on May 17 in a 3–2 loss against HIFK Fotboll. Jaro would finish the 2015 Veikkausliiga season at the bottom of the table, and were relegated to the Ykkönen for the 2016 season.

Ottawa Fury
On July 20, 2016, FF Jaro announced that Jamar Dixon had signed with the Ottawa Fury of the North American Soccer League. Dixon made his debut on July 27, 2016 against the Carolina Railhawks. In November 2016, the Fury announced that they had re-signed Dixon, and that he would stay with the club as it moved to the United Soccer League for the 2017 season. In June 2017, Dixon would score his first goal for the club in a 2–2 draw with New York Red Bulls II. Dixon would be named the Fury's team MVP of the year for the 2017 season, and would re-sign with the club following the 2017 season. After the 2018 season, the Fury would announce that Dixon would return to the Fury for the 2019 season. After four seasons with the Fury, the club would cease operations for the 2020 season, making Dixon a free agent.

Pacific FC
On January 21, 2020, Dixon signed with Canadian Premier League side Pacific FC. He made his debut as a substitute on August 15 against the HFX Wanderers. Prior to the 2021 season, Dixon was named Pacific FC captain due to the retirement of former captain Marcel de Jong. In January 2022, he signed a new one-year contract with Pacific. In September 2022 Pacific announced that at the conclusion of the season Dixon would be retiring. Upon his retirement, Pacific announced Dixon would be joining the club's front office as their Manager of Football and Player Development.

International career
Dixon made his debut for the Canadian national team in a friendly against the United States on February 5, 2016. In August 2016, Dixon was called up for Canada's final fourth round qualifiers for the 2018 FIFA World Cup against Honduras and El Salvador.

Personal life
Dixon was born in Ottawa to a Jamaican father and a Barbadian mother. He is a cousin of former professional basketball player Ryan Bell.

Honours

Club
Pacific FC
Canadian Premier League: 2021

Career statistics

Club

International

References

External links

1989 births
Living people
Association football midfielders
Canadian soccer players
Soccer players from Ottawa
Canadian people of Barbadian descent
Canadian people of Jamaican descent
Black Canadian soccer players
Canadian expatriate soccer players
Expatriate footballers in Sweden
Canadian expatriate sportspeople in Sweden
Expatriate footballers in Finland
Canadian expatriate sportspeople in Finland
Victoria Highlanders players
BW 90 IF players
TP-47 players
JIPPO players
FF Jaro players
Ottawa Fury FC players
Pacific FC players
USL League Two players
Division 2 (Swedish football) players
Kakkonen players
Ykkönen players
Veikkausliiga players
North American Soccer League players
USL Championship players
Canadian Premier League players
Canada men's international soccer players